Blue-ringed octopuses, comprising the genus Hapalochlaena, are four extremely venomous species of octopus that are found in tide pools and coral reefs in the Pacific and Indian oceans, from Japan to Australia. They can be identified by their yellowish skin and characteristic blue and black rings that change color dramatically when the animal is threatened. They eat small crustaceans, including crabs, hermit crabs, shrimp, and other small sea animals.

They are one of the world's most venomous marine animals. Despite their small size——and relatively docile nature, they are very dangerous to humans if provoked when handled because their venom contains the powerful neurotoxin tetrodotoxin.

The species tend to have a lifespan of approximately two to three years. This may vary depending on factors such as nutrition, temperature and the intensity of light within its habitat.

Classification 
The genus was described by British zoologist Guy Coburn Robson in 1929. There are four confirmed species of Hapalochlaena, and six possible but still undescribed species being researched:
 Greater blue-ringed octopus (Hapalochlaena lunulata)
 Southern blue-ringed octopus or lesser blue-ringed octopus (Hapalochlaena maculosa)
 Blue-lined octopus (Hapalochlaena fasciata)
 Hapalochlaena nierstraszi was documented and described in 1938 from a single specimen found in the Bay of Bengal, with a second specimen caught and described in 2013.

Behavior 
Blue-ringed octopuses spend most of their time hiding in crevices while displaying effective camouflage patterns with their dermal chromatophore cells.  Like all octopuses, they can change shape easily, which helps them to squeeze into crevices much smaller than themselves. This, along with piling up rocks outside the entrance to its lair, helps safeguard the octopus from predators.

If they are provoked, they quickly change color, becoming bright yellow with each of the 50–60 rings flashing bright iridescent blue within a third of a second as an aposematic warning display.  In the greater blue-ringed octopus (Hapalochlaena lunulata), the rings contain multi-layer light reflectors called iridophores.  These are arranged to reflect blue–green light in a wide viewing direction. Beneath and around each ring there are dark pigmented chromatophores which can be expanded within 1 second to enhance the contrast of the rings. There are no chromatophores above the ring, which is unusual for cephalopods as they typically use chromatophores to cover or spectrally modify iridescence. The fast flashes of the blue rings are achieved by using muscles which are under neural control. Under normal circumstances, each ring is hidden by contraction of muscles above the iridophores.  When these relax and muscles outside the ring contract, the iridescence is exposed thereby revealing the blue color.

Similar to other Octopoda, the blue-ringed octopus swims by expelling water from a funnel in a form of jet propulsion.

Feeding 
The blue-ringed octopus diet typically consists of small crustaceans such as crabs and shrimp. They also tend to take advantage of small injured fish if they can catch them. The blue-ringed octopus pounces on its prey, seizing it with its arms and pulling it towards its mouth. It uses its horny beak to pierce through the tough crab or shrimp exoskeleton, releasing its venom. The venom paralyzes the muscles required for movement, which effectively kills the prey.

Reproduction 
The mating ritual for the blue-ringed octopus begins when a male approaches a female and begins to caress her with his modified arm, the hectocotylus. A male mates with a female by grabbing her, which sometimes completely obscures the female's vision, then transferring sperm packets by inserting his hectocotylus into her mantle cavity repeatedly. Mating continues until the female has had enough, and in at least one species the female has to remove the over-enthusiastic male by force. Males will attempt copulation with members of their own species regardless of sex or size, but interactions between males are most often shorter in duration and end with the mounting octopus withdrawing the hectocotylus without packet insertion or struggle.

Blue-ringed octopus females lay only one clutch of about 50 eggs in their lifetimes, towards the end of fall. Eggs are laid and then incubated underneath the female's arms for about six months, during this process the female does not eat. After the eggs hatch, the female dies, and the new offspring will reach maturity and be able to mate by the next year.

Mating behavior 
In the southern blue-ringed octopus, body mass is observed to be the strongest factor that influence copulatory rates. Evidence of female preference of larger males is apparent, although no male preference of females is shown. In this species, it is suggested that males expend more effort than females to initiate copulation. Additionally, it is unlikely that males use odor cues to identify females with which to mate. Male-male mounting attempts are common in H. maculosa, proposing that there is no discrimination between sex. Male blue-ringed octopus will adjust mating durations based on the female's recent mating history. Termination of copulation is not likely to happen with a female if she has not yet mated with another male. Duration length of mating is also found to be longer in these cases as well.

Toxicity 
The blue-ringed octopus, despite its small size, carries enough venom to kill 26 adult humans within minutes. Their bites are tiny and often painless, with many victims not realizing they have been envenomated until respiratory depression and paralysis begins. No blue-ringed octopus antivenom is available.

Venom 

The octopus produces venom containing tetrodotoxin, histamine, tryptamine, octopamine, taurine, acetylcholine and dopamine. The venom can result in nausea, respiratory arrest, heart failure, severe and sometimes total paralysis, blindness, and can lead to death within minutes if not treated. Death is usually from suffocation due to paralysis of the diaphragm.

The venom is produced in the posterior salivary gland of the octopus. The salivary glands possess a tubuloacinar exocrine structure and are located in the intestinal blood space.

The major neurotoxin component of the blue-ringed octopus is a compound that was originally known as maculotoxin but was later found to be identical to tetrodotoxin, a neurotoxin also found in pufferfish, rough skinned newts and in some poison dart frogs. Tetrodotoxin blocks sodium channels, causing motor paralysis and respiratory arrest within minutes of exposure. The octopus's own sodium channels are adapted to be resistant to tetrodotoxin. The tetrodotoxin is produced by bacteria in the salivary glands of the octopus.

Direct contact is necessary to be envenomated. Faced with danger, the octopus's first instinct is to flee. If the threat persists, the octopus will go into a defensive stance, and display its blue rings. If the octopus is cornered and touched, it may bite and envenomate its attacker.

Estimates of the number of recorded fatalities caused by blue-ringed octopuses vary, ranging from seven to sixteen deaths; most scholars agree that there have been at least eleven.

Tetrodotoxin can be found in nearly every organ and gland of its body. Even sensitive areas such as the Needham's sac, branchial heart, nephridia, and gills, have been found to contain tetrodotoxin, and it has no effect on the octopus's normal functions. This may be possible through a unique blood transport. The mother will inject the neurotoxin into her eggs to make them generate their own venom before hatching.

Effects 
Tetrodotoxin causes severe and often total body paralysis. Tetrodotoxin envenomation can result in victims being fully aware of their surroundings but unable to move. Because of the paralysis, they have no way of signaling for help or indicating distress. The victim remains conscious and alert in a manner similar to the effect of curare or pancuronium bromide. This effect is temporary and will fade over a period of hours as the tetrodotoxin is metabolized and excreted by the body.

The symptoms vary in severity, with children being the most at risk because of their small body size.

Treatment 
First aid treatment is pressure on the wound and artificial respiration once the paralysis has disabled the victim's respiratory muscles, which often occurs within minutes of being bitten. Because the venom primarily kills through paralysis, victims are frequently saved if artificial respiration is started and maintained before marked cyanosis and hypotension develop. Respiratory support until medical assistance arrives will improve the victim's chances of survival. Definitive hospital treatment involves placing the patient on a ventilator until the toxin is removed by the body. Victims who survive the first 24 hours usually recover completely.

Conservation 
Currently the blue-ringed octopus population information is listed as Least Concern according to the International Union for the Conservation of Nature (IUCN). However, threats such as bioprospecting, habitat fragmentation, degradation, overfishing, and human disturbance, as well as species collections for aquarium trade, may be threats to population numbers. It is possible that Hapalochlaena contribute to a variety of advantages to marine conservation. This genera of octopus provide stability of habitat biodiversity as well as expand the balance of marine food webs. Various species of blue-ringed octopus may help control populations of Asian date mussels. Additionally, future research of tetrodotoxins produced by the blue-ringed octopus may produce new medicinal discoveries.

In popular culture 
In the 1983 James Bond film Octopussy, the blue-ringed octopus is the prominent symbol of the secret order of female bandits and smugglers, appearing in an aquarium tank, on silk robes, and as a tattoo on women in the order.  The animal was also featured in the book State of Fear by Michael Crichton, where a terrorist organization utilized the animal's venom as a favored murder weapon. The Adventure Zone featured a blue-ringed octopus in its "Petals to the Metal" series.

A video, originally posted on TikTok, of a tourist in Australia handling a blue-ringed octopus went viral in January 2019.

A diner in China was accidentally served a blue-ringed octopus on January 2023.

References

External links 

 CephBase: Hapalochlaena
 Blue Ring Octopuses (Hapalochlaena spec.)
 Life In The Fast Lane – Toxicology Conundrum #011
 PBS Nature
 

Octopodidae
Venomous molluscs